Henguiyeh (also Romanized as Hengū’īyeh; also known as Hengū) is a village in Pariz Rural District, Pariz District, Sirjan County, Kerman Province, Iran. At the 2006 census, its population was 9, in 4 families.

References 

Populated places in Sirjan County